Davallia trichomanoides, also known as black rabbit's foot fern, is a fern in the family Davalliaceae which is found in tropical Asia. Its height is from 15 to 45 cm. Partial or full shade is required for the growth of it. It can survive in dryness. They have pinnate leaves.

References

 Springer Verlag, Planta, 1977, p. 133.
 Pauline Anne Lizotte, Cyanogenesis in Davallia Trichomanoides (Blume), 1987

Davalliaceae
Ferns of Asia
Flora of tropical Asia